Brenda Louise Romero (née Garno, born October 12, 1966), previously known as Brenda Brathwaite, is an American game designer and developer in the video game industry. She was born in Ogdensburg, New York and is a graduate of Clarkson University. Romero is best known for her work on the Wizardry series of role-playing video games and, more recently, the non-digital series The Mechanic is the Message. She has worked in game development since 1981 and has credits on 49 game titles.

For Wizardry, Romero provided game design, level design, system design, writing and scripting. She also wrote the manuals and documentation for some products in the series. Romero provided writing and documentation for the award-winning Jagged Alliance series. She was the lead designer for Playboy: The Mansion and Dungeons & Dragons: Heroes.

Career
Romero began her career in 1981 at video game developer and publisher Sir-tech Software, Inc., on the Wizardry role-playing team. She worked first as a tester, and moved up through the ranks to designer for Wizardry 8. While at Sir-tech, Romero also worked on the Jagged Alliance and Realms of Arkania series. She was employed with Sir-tech for 18 years before moving on to Atari where she worked on the Dungeons & Dragons series for consoles before joining Cyberlore Studios in 2003 to work on the Playboy: The Mansion game. Romero's research for the game was ultimately published in a book, Sex in Video Games.

Nerve magazine cited her as a "New Radical" — one of "the 50 artists, actors, authors, activists and icons who are making the world a more stimulating place". In 2009, Next Generation magazine identified her as the woman with the longest continuous service in video game development.

Romero served as Chair of the Savannah College of Art and Design's Interactive Design and Game Development department until November 2009. She moved to San Francisco to consult as Creative Director for social media company Slide, Inc., and then became Creative Director of social gaming company Lolapps in May 2010. She co-founded the social game company Loot Drop with John Romero in November 2010, then left Lolapps and joined Loot Drop in February 2011. In 2013, Romero became the first game designer in residence at the Games and Playable Media Program of the University of California at Santa Cruz. She also served as the program's director. Brenda was the Program Director of the MSc program in Game Design and Development at the University of Limerick in Limerick, Ireland until December 2018.

Recognition
Brenda has won several awards in her long career. Some highlights include RPG of the Year for Wizardry 8, a Fulbright Scholar award in 2014, the Game Developer's Choice Ambassador Award in 2015, the Development Legend award at the Develop:Brighton awards.

Personal life
Romero married game developer John Romero on October 27, 2012. Together, they worked on Ravenwood Fair, with John as lead designer and Brenda as creative director and game designer. John and Brenda became engaged on March 24, 2012. Brenda has three children from a previous marriage.

IGDA and activism

Brenda Romero was an active member of the International Game Developers Association (IGDA). In 2008, she was elected to the IGDA's Board of Directors. On March 28, 2013, she resigned as co-chair of the IGDA Women in Games SIG.

She had founded the International Game Developers Sex Special Interest Group (Sex SIG) in 2005.
Since working on Playboy, she has studied adult and sexual content in video games and is regularly interviewed about the subject in the media.
She has written a book on the subject, Sex in Video Games.

She is an anti-censorship activist and a proponent of parental rating awareness.

Academics
She is a regular speaker at universities and conferences, including the Game Developers Conference, Austin Game Developers Conference, and Montreal International Games Summit. Some of her lectures have been held at the Massachusetts Institute of Technology, The Guildhall at Southern Methodist University, and Clarkson University.

In the spring of 2007, she was awarded the Presidential Fellowship at Savannah College of Art and Design to develop an exhibit and presentation titled, "What You Don't Know About Video Games...". In April 2008, Romero became Chair of the Interactive Design and Game Development department at the Savannah College of Art and Design (SCAD). Brathwaite left SCAD in November 2009 to return to full-time commercial game development.

In December 2012, she was appointed "Game Designer in Residence" at the University of California, Santa Cruz.

In March 2014, she was awarded a Fulbright Fellowship.

The Mechanic is the Message
In February 2008, Romero began work on a series of non-digital games known collectively as The Mechanic is the Message. According to the series abstract:

The series is composed of six separate non-digital games that experiment with the traditional notions of games.

 The New World, 2008
 Síochán leat, 2009
 Train, 2009
 Mexican Kitchen Workers – prototype
 Cité Soleil - concept phase
 One Falls for Each of Us – concept phase

Of the six, Train has received the most attention, and won the Vanguard Award at Indiecade in October 2009 for "pushing the boundaries of game design and showing us what games can do." Train was also featured in The Wall Street Journal as well as on game industry sites including Gamasutra, where it received accolades for its ability to evoke meaning through gestures, the Escapist Magazine, Extra Credits,  and on Kotaku. Romero delivered Train: How I Dumped Electricity and Learned to Love Design at the 2010 Gamesauce Conference.

Síochán leat (Irish for "peace be with you") chronicles the history of her children's heritage. Romero made the game following The New World, a game she originally made to teach her daughter about the slave trade. Romero designed Síochán leat to teach her daughter about her Irish heritage and traces the family's history from the Cromwellian invasion of Ireland to their ancestor's eventual immigration into the West Indies on the paternal side and Canada on the maternal side. The game features a burlap pillow simulating an earthen mound covered by 26 pieces of grass, each representing a county in Ireland. In a talk given at the Austin Game Developers Conference in September 2009, Romero noted that the burlap was filled with mementos of her upbringing and her heritage, including photographs of her great grandfather, Paddy Donovan, and one of her mother's rosaries. On her blog, Romero notes that "the game is signed in many ways and is highly autobiographical. It is my history and it also reveals my feelings about its present state."

Works

Bibliography
 Sex in Video Games is a nonfiction book about the history of sex content in video games.
 Challenges for Game Designers is a non-fiction book that aims to challenge and improves your game design abilities.
 Game Balance is a nonfiction book about balancing computer, video and non-digital games.
 Breaking Into the Game Industry: Advice for a Successful Career From Those Who Have Done It is a non-fiction book about how to get into the game industry with advice from several game industry professionals.

References

External links

 Romero Games
 Brenda Romero at Twitter
 Brenda Romero's personal site
 Romero's "Applied Game Design" blog
 
 MTV Interview with Romero
 Gamasutra Book Review
 Gamasutra Interview with Romero
 

1966 births
Living people
American video game designers
Free speech activists
People from Ogdensburg, New York
Clarkson University alumni
Women video game designers
Women video game developers
Game Developers Conference Ambassador Award recipients